John Todd House is a historic home located at East Hanover Township, Dauphin County, Pennsylvania.  It was built about 1772, and is a -story, 5-bay fieldstone building in the Georgian style.  A stone addition was built in 1954.  Also on the property are a contributing summer house (1832) and hand-dug well.

It was added to the National Register of Historic Places in 1988.

References

Houses on the National Register of Historic Places in Pennsylvania
Georgian architecture in Pennsylvania
Houses completed in 1772
Houses in Dauphin County, Pennsylvania
Historic districts on the National Register of Historic Places in Pennsylvania
National Register of Historic Places in Dauphin County, Pennsylvania